Anna Weidenholzer (born 1984) is an Austrian journalist and writer.

Life 
Weidenholzer studied Comparative Literature in Vienna and Wrocław and graduated with a thesis on Bosnia and Herzegovina Intercultural Literature. She worked as a journalist for Oberösterreichische Nachrichten, and since 2010 has been a freelance writer. In 2012 she was writer in residence at Kitzbuhel.

Her first book Der Platz des Hundes (2010) was nominated for the European debut novel festival in Kiel. In 2013, her book Der Winter tut den Fischen gut was nominated for the Leipzig Book Fair Prize, and she was awarded the Reinhard Priessnitz Prize.

Awards 
 2009 Alfred Gesswein Literaturpreis
 2011 Aufenthaltsstipendium Schloss Wiepersdorf
 2011/12 Staatsstipendium für Literatur
 2012 Aufenthaltsstipendium im Literarischen Colloquium Berlin
 2012 Kitzbüheler Stadtschreiberin
 2013 Reinhard Priessnitz Preis

Works 
 Der Platz des Hundes (Erzählungen, 2010)
 Der Winter tut den Fischen gut (Roman, 2012)

References

External links 

 Homepage von Anna Weidenholzer
 "Als Kind wär ich am liebsten ein Pferd gewesen.", Feature über Anna Weidenholzer von Eva Schobel, Oe1 Radio 30. September 2013
 Eintrag zu Anna Weidenholzer von Harald Klauhs für die OÖ Literaturgeschichte des StifterHauses
 
 

1984 births
Living people
Writers from Linz
21st-century Austrian novelists
21st-century Austrian writers
Austrian women novelists
Austrian journalists
German-language writers
21st-century Austrian women writers
20th-century Austrian women writers